mail.com is a web portal and web-based email service provider owned by the internet company 1&1 Mail & Media Inc., headquartered in Philadelphia, Pennsylvania, United States. 1&1 Mail & Media Inc. is a subsidiary of United Internet Group, a publicly listed internet services company based in Montabaur, Germany.

mail.com offers a free, advertising-supported email service as well as subscription-based premium email and cloud storage plans. Its services are primarily aimed at private users and small- and medium-sized businesses.

On its homepage, mail.com features sponsored news, blog posts and browser games. It also provides a search engine, which is enhanced by Google.

Features
mail.com's email service includes features such as 65 GB of storage for emails, choice of over 200 domains and cloud storage.

Domains
When creating a free email account, mail.com lets users choose from more than 200 brand-neutral email domains that include geographical locations, professions, beliefs and interests, such as email.com, usa.com, religious.com, graphic-designer.com, and catlover.com.

Security

mail.com is one of the last remaining major email providers that does not require a personal phone number to set up an inbox, allowing access to users who do not have or do not wish to provide a phone number to a third party to use email. This allows greater privacy, but prevents users from enabling two-factor authentication (2FA), a form of multi-factor authentication. Enabling 2FA with mail.com does require verification of a mobile phone number, followed by the configuration of Time-based One-Time Passwords.

Once 2FA has been enabled for an account, logging in to that email account requires a dynamically generated code.

All mail.com customers’ private data stored in the company-owned data center located in Lenexa, Kansas, United States. mail.com uses SSL to ensure secure data transfer via the internet. Both in the mail.com account and on the online portal, users’ data is processed in compliance with legal requirements and according to stringent security standards. mail.com also offers configuration options to control interest-based advertisement and newsletter settings.

mail.com email accounts are protected by an antivirus software that scans through emails and attachments, while only checking for malware. The anti-spam filter also helps detect unwanted junk mail and automatically sorts it into the spam folder. mail.com also provides best-practice tips in order to increase security for mailboxes.

Attachments 
With regard to attachment size limits, mail.com is a leader among major free email service providers. It lets users send large files via email, allowing a maximum attachment size of 30 MB. Premium subscribers can send attachments up to 100 MB.

Storage
mail.com offers its users an email storage capacity of 65 GB. On top of that, up to 2 GB of files, pictures and videos can be saved in the mail.com Cloud. This cloud solution also makes it possible to share files online with multiple people at once.

Organizer
The Organizer, also integrated in every mail.com account, lets users schedule tasks and events and sends them automatic appointment reminders as well as daily appointment overviews. Similar to desktop organizer applications, users can set reminders, send event invitations by email, share calendars with others and import and export data to and from the *.ics and *.csv formats.

Mobile apps
mail.com offers free email apps for Android and iOS. Access to these apps can optionally protected by a four-digit PIN. The apps can also be used with non-mail.com email accounts.

Mail Collector 
Mail Collector is a feature that lets users merge email accounts from different providers. With mail.com as a primary account, all other email addresses can be imported into the mail.com account. The Mail Collector then automatically forwards all incoming emails into the primary mailbox.

Online Office 
Online Office is a free alternative to Microsoft Office. It contains a document editor, presentation maker and spreadsheet creator and can be used without installing any software.

Alias email addresses 
An alias address allows users to customize the sender email address shown in their correspondence by creating an additional email address within an existing mail.com account. Up to ten alias addresses can be registered at the same time, all associated with the main mail.com email account. This feature enables the use of multiple email addresses from a single mailbox.

Other features 
Accounts can be customized with a preferred account language (English, Spanish or French).

Inactivity 
mail.com closes and deletes free accounts that have been inactive for 6 months; there is no way to recover deleted free email accounts and the data they contained.

Premium Service
For a fee, mail.com offers an upgrade to a Premium service which provides users with various add-on features. This package includes ad-free inbox, telephone support, POP3 and IMAP integration, automatic email forwarding to another email address, read receipt, inbox personalization, scheduled sending and email recall, and additional cloud storage.

History
mail.com was originally formed in 1995 as Vanity Mail Services (corporate name Globecomm Inc.), by Gerald Gorman, an investment banker at Donaldson, Lufkin & Jenrette, and Gary Millin, a Harvard Business School student at the time.

They spent a majority of Gorman's wealth to register and promote a total of 544 domains, and later began to buy domain names from other companies.  At one time the company owned more than 1,200 domains on speculation, including world.com, usa.com, india.com, europe.com, asia.com, doctor.com, scientist.com, and lawyer.com. To raise money to pay the yearly domain registration fees, they offered vanity domain email services to the public from the domains they owned under the brand name iName, and later began hosting mail services on behalf of the owners of other domains, and for Internet service providers. The speculation was often successful. In 1999 the company sold kosher.com, london.com, and england.com for $2 million.

By 1999 the company had raised venture financing from Primus Capital Funds and Sycamore Ventures, and changed its name to mail.com. It conducted an initial public offering in June 1999. By 2000 it was supporting 14.6 million email accounts, mostly for free, and remained unprofitable.  It sold the mail.com domain and consumer email services division to Net2Phone, changed its name to Easylink, and changed its business operations to focus on managed file transfer services in April 2001, after acquiring Swift Telecommunications, which in turn had spun off the "Easylink" business unit from AT&T.

In 2002, AltaVista quit the email service business they had served together with Mail.com under its i-name branding. Addresses using "AltaVista" domains were eventually closed; other email domains once offered by AltaVista remain operational through Mail.com.

In 2004 Jay Penske, son of automobile racing figure Roger Penske, joined and became CEO of Velocity Services, an affinity marketing and Internet services company operating as Interactive Digital Publishing Group. The company acquired the mail.com domain, and re-launched it as a new service in 2007. Parent company Mail.com Media Corporation (MMC) went on to acquire content websites such as Deadline Hollywood, Movieline and the Boy Genius Report.

In September 2010, MMC sold the mail.com email and portal service to United Internet, at the time already Europe’s largest internet company, which intended to operate mail.com on its GMX email platform. While existing accounts could be accessed from anywhere, users accessing the site from German-speaking countries could no longer sign up and were instead invited to use United Internet's GMX services geared to those markets (gmx.de, gmx.at, gmx.ch). In purchasing the mail.com brand, United Internet was aiming to leverage the unique character of the mail.com name and its many domains as part of its push for international expansion. At the time of the purchase CEO Jan Oetjen noted, “On the highly competitive international e-mail market, we perceive mail.com as a unique opportunity for differentiation which cannot be copied."

In the first quarter of 2016, mail.com launched a new support and contact portal, offering improved usability and FAQs for its customers. The first mail.com mobile email app for Android users was released in February 2016, complementing its iOS app. A mobile webmailer was also rolled out for users who did not have the app installed.

In June 2020, mail.com celebrated its 25th anniversary.

References

External links 
 mail.com Email

Internet technology companies of the United States
Internet properties established in 1995
Webmail